Porphyra haitanensis is a species of red algae, (also called tan zicai in Chinese).

References

Bangiophyceae
Edible seaweeds